Oleg Andreyevich Kozhemyakin (born 30 May 1995) is a Russian professional football player who plays for FC Torpedo Moscow.

Club career
He made his professional debut in the Russian Professional Football League for FC Metallurg Lipetsk on 2 August 2014 in a game against FC Arsenal-2 Tula.

He made his Russian Football National League debut for FC Shinnik Yaroslavl on 17 July 2018 in a game against FC Avangard Kursk.

He made his Russian Premier League debut for FC Rotor Volgograd on 11 August 2020 in a game against FC Zenit Saint Petersburg.

Honours
Torpedo Moscow
 Russian Football National League : 2021-22

Career statistics

References

External links
 
 
 
 

1995 births
Sportspeople from Kryvyi Rih
Ukrainian emigrants to Russia
Living people
Russian footballers
Association football defenders
Association football midfielders
FC Metallurg Lipetsk players
FC Lokomotiv Moscow players
FC Shinnik Yaroslavl players
FC Rotor Volgograd players
FC Torpedo Moscow players
Russian Second League players
Russian First League players
Russian Premier League players